Okabayashi is a Japanese surname. Notable people with the surname include:

, Japanese singer
, Japanese jujutsuka
Okabayashi Shoken, Japanese samurai
, Japanese professional wrestler
, Japanese baseball player
, Japanese-Brazilian engineer

See also
6737 Okabayashi, a main-belt asteroid

Japanese-language surnames